Palkanlu-ye Bala (also Romanized as Pālkānlū-ye Bālā and Pālkānlū Bālā; also known as Pālkānlū-ye ‘Olyā and Pālkānlū ‘Alūkhān) is a village in Jirestan Rural District, Sarhad District, Shirvan County, North Khorasan Province, Iran. At the 2006 census, its population was 343, in 74 families.

References 

Populated places in Shirvan County